MSU Union (formerly the MAC Memorial Union) is a central gathering place for students of Michigan State University. Construction was started in 1923 and was completed in 1925. It includes a food court, convenience store, apparel shop, USPS post office, computer lab, Spartan Lanes, MSUFCU, MSU Dairy Store, Biggby's, conference rooms, and classrooms.

In 2023, it was among the sites of a mass shooting on campus.

External links 

 

Michigan State University campus
East Lansing, Michigan
Student activity centers in the United States